Turner Mountain Ski Resort is an alpine ski area in the western United States, located in northwest Montana,  north of Libby.

The mountain is known for its fall-line powder skiing. Libby is located along the western portion of U.S. Route 2 in the Kootenai Valley between the Cabinet Mountains to the south and the Purcell Mountains to the north.

Turner is 22 miles north of Libby that once was a mining and logging town. In the late 1930s, an enthusiastic group of Libby skiers formed Kootenai Ski Club (later Libby Ski Club) in order to develop a ski area. In the 1950s they started a plan to develop Turner Mountain into a ski area, and it was opened on New Year's weekend of 1961. The summer after the first season, a T-bar was added.

Turner Mountain Ski Area is volunteer-run and managed by a nonprofit organization called Kootenai Winter Sports Ski Education Foundation, Inc..

The resort received funding from the City of Libby Economic Development Fund to develop a new lodge facility. It was completed in February 2006.

The T-bar to the summit, over a mile (1.6 km) in length, debuted in 1961. It was succeeded by a double chairlift in the fall of 2001.

References

External links
 

Buildings and structures in Lincoln County, Montana
Ski areas and resorts in Montana
Tourist attractions in Lincoln County, Montana